Charlotte "Chattie" Cooper Sterry (née Charlotte Reinagle Cooper; 22 September 1870 – 10 October 1966) was an English female tennis player who won five singles titles at the Wimbledon Championships and in 1900 became Olympic champion. In winning in Paris on 11 July 1900, she became the first female Olympic tennis champion as well as the first individual female Olympic champion.

Early life and career

Charlotte Cooper was born on 22 September 1870 at Waldham Lodge, Ealing, Middlesex, England, the youngest daughter of Henry Cooper, a miller, and his wife Teresa Georgiana Miller. She learned to play tennis at the Ealing Lawn Tennis Club where she was first coached by H. Lawrence and later by Charles Martin and Harold Mahony. She won her first senior singles title in 1893 at Ilkley. Between 1893 and 1917 she participated in 21 Wimbledon tournaments. At her first appearance she reached the semifinals of the singles event in which she lost to Blanche Bingley Hillyard. She won her first singles title in 1895, defeating Helen Jackson in the final of the All-Comers event. In that match she was down 0–5 in both sets but managed to win in straight sets. In 1896, she successfully defended her title in the Challenge Round against Alice Simpson Pickering. Between 1897 and 1901 the titles were divided between Cooper Sterry (1898, 1901) and Bingley Hillyard (1897, 1899, 1900). The 1902 Challenge Round match against Muriel Robb was halted on the first day of play due to rainfall at 6–4, 11–13. The match was replayed in its entirety the next day and Robb won 7–5, 6–1, playing a total of 53 games which was then a record for the longest women's singles final. In 1908 as a mother of two she won her last singles title when she defeated Agnes Morton in straight sets in the All-Comers final after a seven-year hiatus and at the age of 37. She is the oldest Wimbledon's ladies’ singles champion and her record of eight consecutive singles finals stood until 1990 when Martina Navratilova reached her ninth consecutive singles final.

In addition to her singles titles, Cooper Sterry also won seven All-England mixed doubles titles; five times with Harold Mahony (1894–1898)  and once with Laurence Doherty (1900) and Xenophon Casdagli (1908). In 1913 she reached the final of the first Wimbledon women's doubles event with Dorothea Douglass, 18 years after winning her first Wimbledon title.

She won the singles title at the Irish Lawn Tennis Championships in 1895 and 1898, a prestigious tournament at the time. At the 1900 Summer Olympics, where women participated for the first time, Cooper Sterry won the tennis singles event. On 11 July 1900 she defeated Hélène Prévost in the final in straight sets and became the first female Olympic tennis champion as well as the first individual female Olympic champion. With Reginald Doherty, she won the mixed doubles title after a straight-sets victory in the final against Hélène Prévost and Harold Mahony. In 1901 she won the singles title at the German Championships, and in 1902 she won the Swiss Championship. Cooper Sterry remained active in competitive tennis and continued to play in championship events well into her 50s.

On 12 January 1901 she married Alfred Sterry, a solicitor, who became president of the Lawn Tennis Association. They had two children: Rex (1903–81) who was the vice-chairman of the All England Club for a period of 15 years during the 1960s and 1970s and Gwen (born 1905), a tennis player who participated at Wimbledon and played on Britain's Wightman Cup team.

Cooper Sterry, who had been deaf since the age of 26, died on 10 October 1966 at the age of 96, in Helensburgh, Scotland.

She was inducted into the International Tennis Hall of Fame in 2013.

Playing style
Cooper Sterry had an offensive style of playing, attacking the net when the opportunity arose. She was one of a few female players of her time who served overhead. Her main strengths were her steadiness, temperament and tactical ability. Her excellent volleying skills stood out at a time when this was still a rarity in ladies tennis.

Grand Slam finals

Singles: 11 (5 titles, 6 runners-up)

Doubles: 1 (1 runner-up)

Notes

References

External links
 

1870 births
1966 deaths
19th-century English people
19th-century female tennis players
English female tennis players
English Olympic medallists
Olympic gold medallists for Great Britain
Olympic tennis players of Great Britain
People from Ealing
Tennis players at the 1900 Summer Olympics
Wimbledon champions (pre-Open Era)
Olympic medalists in tennis
Grand Slam (tennis) champions in women's singles
Medalists at the 1900 Summer Olympics
International Tennis Hall of Fame inductees
Tennis people from Greater London
British female tennis players
Tennis players at the 1908 Summer Olympics